The Tonight Show is an Irish news analysis, current affairs and politics programme broadcast on Virgin Media One (formerly known as "TV3") since September 2017. The series is hosted by Claire Brock. Ivan Yates and Matt Cooper original hosted the show. Ivan Yates left the show on July 23, 2020, while on the August 10, 2021, Matt Cooper announced that he would also be leaving the show. The show replaced similar programme titled Tonight with Vincent Browne.

References

2017 Irish television series debuts
2010s in Irish politics
2000s Irish television series
Irish television news shows
Virgin Media Television (Ireland) original programming